The Rats (working title: The Colony) is a 2002 American made-for-TV horror film written by Frank Deasy and directed by John Lafia. The plot follows a clan of rats transformed, as part of a DNA research trial, into man-eating killers who take over a Manhattan department store and threaten to overrun New York City. Originally intended to be air on September 17, 2001, its release was delayed until after the September 11 attacks to remove shots of the World Trade Center towers.

Plot
In Manhattan, when a client is bitten by a rat in the dressing room of Garsons Department Store and contracts Weil's disease, the manager Susan Costello is assigned to hire and help the best exterminator in New York, Jack Carver. Jack and his assistant Ty find a colony of mutant rats in New York City and try to convince the health department administrator and former partner of Jack, Ray Jarrett, how serious the infestation is. But the politician Ray is interested only in covering up the problem to protect the economic interests of powerful groups.

Cast
 Mädchen Amick as Susan Costello
 Vincent Spano as Jack Carver
 Shawn Michael Howard as Ty
 Daveigh Chase as Amy Costello
 David Wolos-Fonteno as Ray Jarrett
 Sheila McCarthy as Miss Paige
 Kim Poirier as Jay
 Elisa Moolecherry as Nyla
 Joe Pingue as Karl

Reception
Andy Webb from "The Movie Scene" gave the film three out of five stars, stating: "What this all boils down to is that "The Rats" is some old fashioned horror fun which plays on people's own fears of rats. Of course if you think rats are cute and adorable then this isn't going to work and you might even be offended at the portrayal of rats or the ridiculous climax. But if you do have a fear of the furry [sic] rodents this movie is not one to watch before you go to sleep." Rod Lott from "Flick Attack", wrote: "Come up with a cliché, and sooner or later, The Rats gets to it, right down to the ever-predictable it-ain’t-really-over final shot. Child’s Play 2 and Man’s Best Friend director John Lafia does a decent job, having experience with all sorts of beasts, like killer dolls, robot dogs and Ally Sheedy." Florita A. from "Hell Horror", scored the film 4 out of 10, writing: "The Rats was made simple, and that was not an ideal thing as the movie flopped although it was a TV movie. I like the idea of rats playing on someone’s fear, but it came down to the film not being executed in the right manner to send frights across to its audience amongst other things."

References

External links
 
 

2002 television films
2002 horror films
American natural horror films
Films about mice and rats
Films directed by John Lafia
Films postponed due to the September 11 attacks
2002 films
Films scored by Elia Cmíral
American horror television films
2000s English-language films
2000s American films